Mateusz Przybyła (born 12 April 1991) is a Polish volleyball player, playing in position middle blocker.

References

External links
 PlusLiga profile
 Volleybox profile
 CEV profile

1991 births
Living people
Polish men's volleyball players
Jastrzębski Węgiel players
AZS Częstochowa players